Sarah Louise Jones (born 25 June 1990) is a Welsh international field hockey player who plays as a midfielder or forward for Wales and Great Britain.

She plays club hockey in the Women's England Hockey League Premier Division for Holcombe.

Jones has also played for Reading and Cardiff Athletic Hockey Club.

She represented Wales at the 2014 Commonwealth Games and 2018 Commonwealth Games.

Jones made her international debut for Great Britain on 17 November 2018 v China.
 She is openly gay.

References

External links
 
 
 

1990 births
Living people
Holcombe Hockey Club players
Reading Hockey Club players
Welsh female field hockey players
British female field hockey players
Women's England Hockey League players
Field hockey players at the 2014 Commonwealth Games
Field hockey players at the 2018 Commonwealth Games
Commonwealth Games competitors for Wales
Field hockey players at the 2020 Summer Olympics
Olympic field hockey players of Great Britain
Olympic bronze medallists for Great Britain
Medalists at the 2020 Summer Olympics
Olympic medalists in field hockey
British LGBT sportspeople